Kota Kasablanka is a mixed-development covering an area of  at Tebet in Jakarta, Indonesia, which consists of office tower, serviced office suites, shopping center, convention hall and condominium towers. This super-block is developed by PT Pakuwon Jati Tbk (PWON).

CasaGrande Residence is the apartment block which has four towers, each has 36 floors namely Mirage, Avalon, Montreal and Montana. There are 3 condominium towers namely Angelo, Bella and Chianti. Prudential Center has serviced office suits, where as there are 2 office towers of 39 and 41 floors.

Kota Kasablanka mall
The mall comprises six floors, the interior design of which is followed by mosaics motifs in the palaces of Morocco.  There are 13 anchor tenants: Sogo, Carrefour, XXI, Amazing Caribbean, Chipmunk, Paperclip, Celebrity Fitness, Wall Street Institute, Ace, Informa, Toy Kingdom, Electronic Solution, Eat & Eat and hundreds of other specialty stores.

The Kasablanka
The Kasablanka is a convention and exhibition center with an area of 6,200 square meters. The Kasablanka is located on the 3rd floor of Kota Kasablanka mall. The Kasablanka has brought concerts to important events, one of which is Barbie Live! Show. Barack Obama, the 44th President of the United States, delivered the keynote address to the Fourth Congress of the Indonesian Diaspora (CID-4) on 1 July 2017 at the Kasablanka Hall.

Concerts

See also

 List of shopping malls in Jakarta

References

Shopping malls in Jakarta
Buildings and structures in Jakarta
Post-independence architecture of Indonesia
South Jakarta